Little Mary Sunshine is a 1916 silent movie directed by Henry King.

Plot
Abandoned by her drunken father after he beats her mother to death, 5-year-old Mary finds refuge in a car where she falls asleep. The car belongs to Bob Daley, a young man who has made the mistake of celebrating his engagement by getting drunk with his friends and then lying about it to Sylvia, his fiancée. Sylvia does not approve of his conduct and throws him out of the house, breaking up with him.

Despondent, Bob staggers to his car where he finds the sleeping child. The two become friends and Bob brings the little girl to his house. Moved by her tragic story, Bob decides to quit drinking and become a serious and responsible parent. Sylvia, affected by the change, is reconciled with her boyfriend, and the couple decide that once they are married, they will adopt little Mary.

Cast
 Baby Marie Osborne : Mary
 Henry King : Bob Daley
 Marguerite Nichols : Sylvia Sanford
 Andrew Arbuckle : Bob's father
 Mollie McConnell : Sylvia's mother

Production
The film was produced by Balboa Amusement Producing Company. It was shot in Long Beach, California.

Distribution
Distributed by Pathé Exchange, the film was released in US cinemas on March 3, 1916. A copy of the film—35mm color-toned nitrate positive with French intertitles—is preserved in a French archive. The film has been remastered and was released on November 22, 2004 by Unknown Video in a Dolby Digital 2.0 mono which also included the 1917 film version of Tom Sawyer. The two silent movies, subtitled in English, feature music by electric organist Bob Vaughn.

References

Bibliography
 The American Film Institute Catalog, Features Films 1911-1920, University of California Press, 1988. 
 Henry King Director - From Silent to 'Scope, Directors Guild of America Publication, 1995.  pp. 21–24

External links

 
 Little Mary Sunshine (1916) - Silent Era
 

1916 films
American silent feature films
American black-and-white films
Silent American drama films
1916 drama films
Films directed by Henry King
Pathé Exchange films
1910s English-language films
1910s American films